Toby Savin (born 4 May 2001) is an English professional footballer who plays as a goalkeeper for  club Accrington Stanley.

Career
Savin joined Accrington Stanley in 2017, after being in the youth academies at  Southport, Wigan Athletic, Everton and Crewe Alexandra. On 19 June 2019, Savin signed a two-year professional contract with Accrington Stanley. On 3 September 2019, Savin made his debut for Accrington in a 2–1 EFL Trophy win against Fleetwood Town. On 30 December 2019, Savin joined Stalybridge Celtic on loan.  He was later recalled by his parent club in January 2020.

Savin made his full English Football League debut on the 12 September 2020, playing the full 90 minutes in an opening day victory against Peterborough United.

On 16 February 2023, Savin joined Stevenage on an emergency loan.

Career statistics

References

2001 births
Living people
Footballers from Southport
Association football goalkeepers
English footballers
Accrington Stanley F.C. players
Stalybridge Celtic F.C. players
Stevenage F.C. players
English Football League players
Northern Premier League players